This is a poetry journal associated with what would later be called Language poetry because during the time span in which This was published, "many poets of the emerging Language school were represented in its pages".

The first three issues were edited by Robert Grenier and Barrett Watten (1971–1973). The subsequent nine issues were edited by Watten (1973–1982).

Some of the writers featured in the pages of This magazine include: Steve Benson, Bill Berkson, Merrill Gilfillan, Lyn Hejinian, Bernadette Mayer, Michael Palmer, Kit Robinson, Jim Rosenberg, and Peter Seaton.

Watten also published monographs under the imprint "This Press" (1974–1986?): "which began with publication of Clark Coolidge's The Maintains in 1974 and published work by Larry Eigner, Ron Silliman, Robert Grenier, Carla Harryman, Ted Greenwald, Kit Robinson, Bruce Andrews, and Alan Davies". These writers also appeared in the magazine during its run of issues.

Selected publications of "This Press"
 Under The Bridge by Carla Harryman. 64pp.
 Sonnets (Memento Mori) by Bruce Andrews. 80 pp.
 1–10 by Barrett Watten. 64 pp.
 Country/Harbor/Quiet/Act/Around by Larry Eigner. Selected prose. 160 pp.
 Series by Robert Grenier. 144 pp.
 Ketjak by Ron Silliman. 96 pp.
 Quartz Hearts by Clark Coolidge. 64 pp.
 You Bet! by Ted Greenwald. 80 pp.
 The Maintains by Clark Coolidge. 104pp.
 The Dolch Stanzas by Kit Robinson. 32 pp.
 Decay by Barrett Watten. 32 pp.

References

 Watten, Barrett, comp., "This 1–12 Index" (Oakland, CA: This Press, 1983).

Alternative magazines
Defunct literary magazines published in the United States
Language poets
Magazines established in 1971
Magazines disestablished in 1982
Magazines published in San Francisco
Poetry organizations
Poetry magazines published in the United States
Small press publishing companies